Patent law in modern mainland China began with the promulgation of the Patent Law of the People's Republic of China, in 1984. In 1985, China acceded to the Paris Convention for the Protection of Industrial Property, followed by the Patent Cooperation Treaty in 1994. When China joined the World Trade Organization (WTO) in 2001, it became a member of the TRIPS agreement.

To comply with its international obligations, as well as to facilitate its development into an innovative country, China has since amended its Patent Law three times: first in 1992, then again in 2000, and most recently in 2009.

Types of patent protection 
Patents in China are granted by the China National Intellectual Property Administration (CNIPA), which was renamed in English on 28 August 2018 from State Intellectual Property Office (SIPO). There are three types of patents: invention patents, utility model patents, and design patents. Invention patents are substantively examined, while utility model patents are subject only to a formal examination.

Enforcement of patents 

Like other forms of intellectual property in China, patents may be enforced by administrative authorities or through civil or criminal litigation.

Administrative patent enforcement 

The legal basis for administrative patent enforcement is found in the Patent Law, the Enforcement Regulations for the Patent Law, and SIPO's Regulations on Administrative Patent Cases.

Two types of illegal patent acts can be handled by administrative authorities - ordinary infringement complaints regarding the making/importation, use, and sale/offering for sale of patented articles; and patent counterfeiting (which encompasses several acts similar to false marking). Administrative enforcement is traditionally the most commonly used option by patent owners and is handled by provincial or city-level intellectual property offices (formerly and still colloquially known as Patent Bureaux).

On accepting a complaint, which requires some prima facie evidence of infringement, the local Bureau can raid infringers' premises and confiscate infringing materials and tooling. Often, the Bureau will attempt to mediate settlement between the parties. However, it is also empowered to make its own decisions. Sanctions can include destruction of products/tooling and an order to stop infringement, but Bureaux cannot award damages to patent owners. In cases of patent counterfeiting, the Bureau can however impose a fine on the infringer. Administrative decisions can be appealed to the People's Court.

Civil litigation 

Courts' jurisdiction over patent proceedings is clarified in the Supreme People's Court's Several Provisions on Issues Relating to the Application of Law to Adjudication of Cases of Patent Disputes. Cases are usually begun in the Intermediate People's Court, although serious cases can be tried in the Higher People's Court and even exceptionally the Supreme People's Court.

A degree of forum shopping is permitted as disputes can be heard either where the defendant is domiciled, or where the infringing act (e.g. sale of infringing goods) took place.

Interim injunctions are available (including the equivalent of an Anton Piller Order), but if relief is granted the plaintiff is bound to initiate proceedings within 15 days thereafter.

On a finding of infringement, the Court has a wide range of remedies available, including final injunctions, destruction of infringing goods/tooling, and compensatory damages (if the plaintiff cannot prove his loss, the maximum statutory damages available are RMB500,000 per infringement).

Criminal proceedings 

China's Criminal Code enables Public Security Bureaux under the People's Procuratorate to take action in cases of serious infringement. Private prosecutions are possible in limited circumstances.

Patent interpretation 

Patents are construed both literally and according to the doctrine of equivalents. In China, an equivalent is an element of an article which is "insubstantially different from" an integer of the patent's claim: a technical feature which can be conceived easily by the patent's addressee that performs substantially the same function as the claim's integer, in substantially the same way, achieving substantially the same result. The "all elements" rule applies, such that for an article to be an infringement it must contain features identical or equivalent to all elements of the patent claim.

Patent validity 

Any person can contest a patent's validity. There is a post-grant opposition procedure available through SIPO, and actions may also be initiated at the Patent Review Board (PRB). Appeals may be made to the Beijing IP Court. Before 2014, appeals were made to the Beijing Intermediate People's Court.

Patent litigation proceedings are bifurcated, meaning that issues of infringement are tried separately (and in a separate venue) from invalidity. Normally infringement proceedings will be stayed (on application by the defendant) pending outcome of the invalidity hearing.

Novelty 

With the Third Amendment to the Patent Law, China now applies a standard of absolute novelty. That is, an invention is not new (and therefore is unpatentable) if it was published or publicly disclosed anywhere in the world before the priority date.

Inventiveness 

To be considered inventive, an invention must have, in the eyes of a notional addressee, prominent substantive features that mark a notable progress in the state of the art, or in the alternative, that the addressee cannot obtain from existing technology all the necessary technical features of the invention.

SIPO's examination guidelines, which are often followed by the Courts, recommend a "problem-solution" approach to assessing obviousness:

1. Identify the closest prior art;
2. Identify the technical problem to be solved;
3. Identify the differences between the prior art and the invention;
4. Would those differences be obvious to the skilled addressee trying to solve the technical problem?

The notional addressee is an ordinary technician skilled in the field of the invention.

Industrial applicability and excluded matter 

An invention possesses industrial applicability if it can be made or used in such a way as to generate effective results. Excluded subject matter is in line with TRIPS, that is scientific discoveries, methods for mental activities, methods for the diagnosis and treatment of disease, animal and plant varieties, and a catch-all for other undesirable inventions.

Software is explicitly included as a method for mental activity. However, SIPO's examination guidelines follow EPO practice and allow software inventions which produce a technical effect and are not merely software-as-such.

In April 2017, SIPO  revised its patent examination guidelines to also allow the patenting of business methods provided the claimed method had technical features.

See also 
 Intellectual property in China
 Law in the People's Republic of China
 Chinese law

Further reading 
 Clark, Douglas, Patent Litigation in China, Oxford University Press, 2015 (2nd Edition) .
 Ganea & Pattloch, Heath (ed.), Intellectual Property Law in China, The Hague, Netherlands : Kluwer Law International, 2005. .
 Rouse, Administrative patent enforcement in China 
 Ordish & Adcock, China Intellectual Property - Challenges & Solutions, Singapore : John Wiley & Sons, 2008. .

References

External links
 IP Key Strategic Partnership and Cooperation between the EU and China on Intellectual Property.
 China IPR SME Helpdesk Provides free information, advice and training support for SMEs to protect and enforce their IPR in China.
 CIELA China IP Litigation Analysis.

People's Republic of China patent law